Henry Wiley may refer to:

 Henry A. Wiley (1867–1943), U.S. Navy officer
 Henry Orton Wiley (1877–1961), Christian theologian

See also
Henry Willey (1824–1907), American lichenologist
Henry Wylie (1844–1918), British Indian Army officer